Geoffrey Toyana (born 27 February 1974) is a South African former first-class cricketer. He is the coach of the Highveld Lions.

References

External links
 

1974 births
Living people
South African cricketers
Easterns cricketers
Gauteng cricketers
Titans cricketers
Sportspeople from Soweto
South African cricket coaches